is a Japanese discount casual wear designer, manufacturer and retailer, with 451 stores (as of May 31, 2022) across the country. It is fully owned by the company Fast Retailing, which is better known as the owner of the retail chain Uniqlo. The name is a pun of the word , meaning free from high cost clothing. Its signature product is a pair of jeans, which costs 990 yen.

History

GU opened its first shop in Chiba in October 2006 as a more affordable concept in fashion than Uniqlo. In 2013, the company opened its first overseas shop in Shanghai in 2013. In 2018, G.U. opened its first store in South Korea. In 2022, G.U. opened its first store in the United States at New York City.

References

External links
 Official website 

Retail companies established in 1973
Clothing brands of Japan
Clothing retailers of Japan
Fast Retailing
Japanese brands
1973 establishments in Japan
Manufacturing companies based in Tokyo
Retail companies based in Tokyo